Melirupu is a place in Arauco Province that is 12 kilometers to the Southwest of Arauco in the direction of Quiapo. It was a small village of about 300 inhabitants in the late 19th century the surrounding land had the same name.

This place was one of the rehues of the Moluche aillarehue of Arauco and the site of the Battle of Millarapue where the Mapuche Toqui Caupolicán was defeated after he assaulted the camp of Governor Don Garcia Hurtado de Mendoza on November 30, 1557.

Sources 
  Francisco Solano Asta-Buruaga y Cienfuegos, Diccionario geográfico de la República de Chile (Geographic dictionary of the Republic of Chile), Segunda Edición Corregida y Aumentada, Nueva York, D. Appleton y Compañía, 1899. pp. 439-40

Geography of Biobío Region